Wolstanton United Urban District was an urban district in the county of Staffordshire. It was formed in 1904 with the civil parishes of Chesterton, Silverdale and Wolstanton. It was abolished in 1932, when it was absorbed into the Newcastle-under-Lyme Municipal Borough.

References
A Vision of Britain - Wolstanton United Urban District

Newcastle-under-Lyme
History of Staffordshire
Local government in Staffordshire
Urban districts of England